Cuthwine was a medieval Bishop of Leicester.

Cuthwine was consecrated in 679. He died about 691.

Citations

References

 Powicke, F. Maurice and E. B. Fryde Handbook of British Chronology 2nd. ed. London:Royal Historical Society 1961

Bishops of Leicester (ancient)
7th-century English bishops